Contract J.A.C.K. is a 2003 first-person shooter video game and the prequel to No One Lives Forever 2: A Spy in H.A.R.M.'s Way. It was developed by Monolith Productions and published by Vivendi Universal Games and its subsidiary Sierra Entertainment. J.A.C.K. ("Just Another Contract Killer") is set in the time frame between the events of the original The Operative: No One Lives Forever and its sequel, No One Lives Forever 2.

Story 
The game follows John Jack, a professional killer recruited by H.A.R.M., a criminal organization central to the No One Lives Forever series. Contract J.A.C.K. is set between No One Lives Forever and No One Lives Forever 2. The game does not involve UNITY, the organization for which Cate Archer works and that opposed H.A.R.M. in the other two games. Rather, J.A.C.K. pits H.A.R.M. against a rival criminal organization, Danger Danger.

After a night of heavy drinking, Jack is apprehended by thugs, who are ordered to kill him. Before they can, he breaks free from the ropes that tied him to a chair and slaughters the thugs that swarm the building. Before he can leave, he receives a phone call from Dimitrij Volkov, H.A.R.M.'s Director of Executive Action. Volkov tells Jack to report to a job interview at the Roman ruins on Malta. The interview consists of Jack mowing down waves of H.A.R.M. troopers as Volkov taunts them over a loudspeaker. In the end, Jack is hired by H.A.R.M.

For his first assignment, Jack must infiltrate a Czechoslovakian military base to figure out why Danger Danger is interested in it. Upon delving deeper into the base, Jack becomes aware that the facility is a secret rocket launch site. Danger Danger is trying to use a Czech rocket to recover Dr. Harij, a H.A.R.M. scientist stranded on the moon after the destruction of H.A.R.M.'s space station in No One Lives Forever. Although Danger Danger is able to launch a rocket full of their men, Jack commandeers a second rocket and heads to the moon after them.

On the moon, Jack must fight through Danger Danger goons to get to Dr. Harij. Danger Danger reaches the scientist first, and they begin destroying the lunar base to prevent Jack from escaping. Jack reaches Danger Danger's rocket seconds before it lifts-off. The effects of the rocket's propulsion and the base's explosion send Jack floating through space on a collision course with the Sun. Il Pazzo (Italian for "The Crazy One"), leader of Danger Danger, begins dispatching men to kill Jack, but he fails, and Jack floats to the other rocket, which had been floating among the debris of the base.

Jack crashes his rocket into the Italian countryside of Tuscany. Il Pazzo is nearby with Dr. Harij, and he flees on a gondola. Jack steals a machine gun-equipped Vespa and pursues them while crossing the city of Florence. After killing hordes of Il Pazzo's men, Jack arrives at a castle where Il Pazzo is holed up with Dr. Harij. Using cannons positioned around the building, Jack kills the defenders. A long-distance battle then ensues between Jack and Il Pazzo. Jack wins, but is not able to kill Il Pazzo completely. After rescuing Dr. Harij, Jack is shot by Volkov and left to die. The game ends with Jack rising up and limping toward Volkov's skis. It is believed that the ending implied why Volkov is confined in a wheel chair and covered in a full-body plaster cast in No One Lives Forever 2.

Game engine 
Contract J.A.C.K. uses the same Lithtech Jupiter engine as used in the base release of No One Lives Forever 2: A Spy in H.A.R.M.'s Way; however, none of the upgrade paths that are available to boost abilities in the latter are present in J.A.C.K.

Reception 

The game received mixed reviews according to the review aggregation website Metacritic.

References

External links 
Official site

2003 video games
Cold War video games
First-person shooters
LithTech games
Monolith Productions games
Multiplayer online games
Video game expansion packs
Video game prequels
Video game spin-offs
Sierra Entertainment games
Fox Interactive games
Spy video games
Video games set in the Czech Republic
Video games set in Italy
Video games set in Malta
Video games set on the Moon
Video games set in the 1960s
Windows games
Windows-only games
Video games developed in the United States